Fulgencio Aquino (January 1, 1915 – July 21, 1994), was a Venezuelan musician and popular composer, the author of the song .

See also 
Venezuelan music

1915 births
1994 deaths
People from Miranda (state)
Venezuelan composers
Male composers
Venezuelan folk harpists
Venezuelan folk musicians
20th-century composers
20th-century male musicians